Allaeanthus kurzii is a species of flowering plant in the family Moraceae.  It is a dioecious shrub native to Southeast Asia where it is found in tropical rainforests or seasonal tropical forests. Its synonym is Broussonetia kurzii. The synonym is an old name and because of its prefix "Broussonetia" , sometimes misplaced to Broussonetia group in plant taxonomy map.

Uses
Its little spherical flower buds are also a food item in Thai cuisine.

See also
List of Thai dishes

References

External links

Plernchai Tangkanakul, Gassinee Trakoontivakorn, Payom Auttaviboonkul, Boonma Niyomvit and Karuna Wongkrajang, Antioxidant Activity of Northern and Northeastern Thai Foods Containing Indigenous Vegetables in Kasetsart J. (Nat. Sci.) 40 (Suppl.) : 47 - 58 (2006)

Moraceae
Flora of East Himalaya
Flora of Indo-China
Medicinal plants of Asia
Dioecious plants
Taxa named by Joseph Dalton Hooker